Dmytro Vladov, born 12 March 1990) is a Ukrainian football midfielder who plays for MFC Mykolaiv in the Ukrainian First League. He is a product of the Chornomorets Youth school system and has played for the reserve and youth squad since 2007.

External links 
Profile on Official Website

Ukrainian footballers
1990 births
Living people
FC Chornomorets Odesa players
MFC Mykolaiv players
Ukrainian Premier League players
Association football midfielders